The 1968 Giro di Lombardia was the 62nd edition of the Giro di Lombardia cycle race and was held on 12 October 1968. The race started in Milan and finished in Como. The race was won by Herman Van Springel of the Dr. Mann team.

General classification

References

1968
Giro di Lombardia
Giro di Lombardia
1968 Super Prestige Pernod